Cheng Man Keung is a retired professional wushu taolu athlete from Hong Kong. He is a five-time medalist at the World Wushu Championships and a two-time world champion.

References 

Hong Kong wushu practitioners
Wushu practitioners at the 2002 Asian Games